The following outline is provided as an overview of and topical guide to tires:

Tire (North American) or tyre (British) – ring-shaped covering that fits around a wheel rim to protect it and enable better vehicle performance by providing a flexible cushion that absorbs shock while keeping the wheel in close contact with the ground.

Tire Industry History
Firestone and Ford tire controversy

Charles Goodyear Medal

Types

By construction

Tubeless tire
Radial tire
Low rolling resistance tire
Run-flat tire
Michelin PAX System
Airless tire
Energy return wheel
Tweel

By tread

Rain tyre
Snow tire
All-terrain tire
Bar grip
Knobby tire
Large tire
Mud-terrain tire
Paddle tire

By material
Orange oil tires

By appearance
Whitewall tire

Vehicle specific
Aircraft tire
Tundra tire
Bicycle tire
Tubular tire
Lego tire
Motorcycle tire
Tractor tire

Use specific
Racing slick
Formula One tires
Spare tire
Continental tire

Components
Bead
Beadlock
Tread
Siping (rubber)
Valve stem
Dunlop valve
Presta valve
Schrader valve

Attributes

 Camber thrust
 Circle of forces
 Cold inflation pressure
 Contact patch
 Cornering force
 Ground pressure
 Pacejka's Magic Formula
 Pneumatic trail
 Relaxation length
 Rolling resistance
 Self aligning torque
 Slip angle
 Steering ratio
 Tire balance
 Tire load sensitivity
 Tire uniformity
 Lateral Force Variation
 Radial Force Variation
 Traction (engineering)
 Treadwear rating

Behaviors
Aquaplaning
Groove wander
Slip (vehicle dynamics)
Tramlining

Maintenance
Tire maintenance
Tire rotation

Inflation
Bicycle pump
Central Tire Inflation System
Tire mousse
Tire-pressure monitoring system
Tire-pressure gauge
Direct TPMS

Tools
Bead breaker
Tire changer
Tire iron

Life cycle
Tire manufacturing
List of tire companies
Retread
Scrap-/Waste tires
Tire recycling
Tire fire

Failure
Blowout
Flat tire
Ozone cracking

Organizations
Standards
European Tyre and Rim Technical Organisation
National Highway Traffic Safety Administration

Technical
ACS Rubber Division
Rubber Chemistry and Technology
Tire Society
Tire Science and Technology

Identification
Tire code
Plus sizing
Tire label
UTQG Uniform Tire Quality Grading

See also

Forensic tire tread evidence
Skid mark
Road slipperiness
Roadway noise
 Rubber-tyred metro
 Rubber-tyred tram
Snow chains
Vehicle dynamics

References

External links 

Tires
Tires
Tires